Erica umbellata is a species of plant in the heather family (Ericaceae) native to the western Iberian Peninsula and northwestern Maghreb.

Description

Erica umbellata is a  bush. It has young stems with barely marked ribs and reddish-brown bark. It has terminal inflorescences, umbelliform, with 3-6 flowers, without involvement of basal bracteoles. The corolla is  intensely pink or purple, occasionally albino.

Distribution and habitat

Erica umbellata is native to the western Iberian Peninsula (Portugal and western Spain) and northwest Africa in Morocco. Inhabiting bare terrain, dwarf or cleared heaths, scrublands, cleared forests, pine forests and subcoastal sand, always on siliceous soils, from sea-level to  altitude. Some populations in the Algarve have very large flowers (up to ) and were denominated var. major. Galician plants with graceful stems and small flowers were described as var. filiformis. Rarely some plants appear with rudimentary or aborted stamens (var. Anandra).

References

umbellata
Flora of Portugal
Flora of Spain
Flora of Morocco